Hamden Bridge is a wooden covered bridge over the West Branch of the Delaware River in the hamlet of Hamden in Delaware County, New York. It was built in 1859, and is a single span, timber and plan framed bridge.  It measures 128 feet long and 18 feet wide.  A supporting center pier was added in 1940.

It was listed on the National Register of Historic Places in 1999.

See also
List of bridges on the National Register of Historic Places in New York
National Register of Historic Places listings in Delaware County, New York

References

External links

 Hamden Bridge, at New York State Covered Bridge Society
 Hamden Bridge, at Covered Bridges of the Northeast USA, a website developed by Hank Brickel

Covered bridges on the National Register of Historic Places in New York (state)
National Register of Historic Places in Delaware County, New York
Bridges completed in 1859
Wooden bridges in New York (state)
Bridges in Delaware County, New York
Tourist attractions in Delaware County, New York
Road bridges on the National Register of Historic Places in New York (state)